Johann Szauer (30 August 1939 – 5 May 1970) was an Austrian footballer. He played in two matches for the Austria national football team in 1966.

References

External links
 

1939 births
1970 deaths
Austrian footballers
Austria international footballers
Place of birth missing
Association footballers not categorized by position